The A1 Ethniki, often referred to as the Greek Volleyball League, is the highest professional volleyball league in Greece. It is run by the Hellenic Volleyball Federation. It is considered one of the top national leagues in European volleyball, as its clubs have made significant success in European competitions.

History
It was first organized in 1928 as a Panhellenic Championship. In the 1968–69 season, the men's Alpha Ethniki category was created at the men's level, which from 1990–91 to 2009–10 was named A1.

Current teams

The clubs for the 2022–23 season:

Championship history
 1935–36 to 1939–40 and 1960–61 to 1967–68: Panhellenic Championship
 1968–69 to 1987–88: A Ethniki
 1988–89 to 2009–10: A1 Ethniki
 2010–11 to present: Volley League

Title holders

 1928:  Panellinios
 1935–36:  Panellinios 
 1936–37:  Panellinios
 1937–38:  EAP
 1938–39:  Panellinios
 1939–40:  Panellinios
 1940–45: Not held due to WWII
 1960–61:  Panellinios
 1961–62:  Milon
 1962–63:  Panathinaikos
 1963–64:  Milon
 1964–65:  Panathinaikos
 1965–66:  Panathinaikos
 1966–67:  Panathinaikos
 1967–68:  Olympiacos
 1968–69:  Olympiacos
 1969–70:  Panathinaikos
 1970–71:  Panathinaikos
 1971–72:  Panathinaikos
 1972–73:  Panathinaikos
 1973–74:  Olympiacos
 1974–75:  Panathinaikos 
 1975–76:  Olympiacos 
 1976–77:  Panathinaikos
 1977–78:  Olympiacos
 1978–79:  Olympiacos
 1979–80:  Olympiacos
 1980–81:  Olympiacos
 1981–82:  Panathinaikos
 1982–83:  Olympiacos
 1983–84:  Panathinaikos
 1984–85:  Panathinaikos
 1985–86:  Panathinaikos
 1986–87:  Olympiacos
 1987–88:  Olympiacos
 1988–89:  Olympiacos
 1989–90:  Olympiacos
 1990–91:  Olympiacos
 1991–92:  Olympiacos
 1992–93:  Olympiacos
 1993–94:  Olympiacos
 1994–95:  Panathinaikos
 1995–96:  Panathinaikos
 1996–97:  Aris
 1997–98:  Olympiacos
 1998–99:  Olympiacos
 1999–00:  Olympiacos
 2000–01:  Olympiacos
 2001–02:  Iraklis
 2002–03:  Olympiacos
 2003–04:  Panathinaikos
 2004–05:  Iraklis
 2005–06:  Panathinaikos
 2006–07:  Iraklis
 2007–08:  Iraklis 
 2008–09:  Olympiacos
 2009–10:  Olympiacos
 2010–11:  Olympiacos
 2011–12:  Iraklis
 2012–13:  Olympiacos
 2013–14:  Olympiacos
 2014–15:  PAOK
 2015–16:  PAOK
 2016–17:  PAOK
 2017–18:  Olympiacos
 2018–19:  Olympiacos
 2019–20:  Panathinaikos
 2020–21:  Olympiacos 
 2021–22:  Panathinaikos

Source: volleyleague.gr

A1 Finals

Performance by club

Sponsors and supporters
 OPAP
 Pame Stoixima
 ERT
 Blue Star Ferries
 Euromedica

See also
A1 Ethniki Women's Volleyball
Greek Volley League MVP

References

External links
Greek-volley.blogspot.com all news about Greek Volleyball
Hellenic Volleyball Federation 
volleyleague.gr
Galanis Sports Data
Greek Volleyball News on Twitter

Volleyball in Greece
Greece men1
Professional sports leagues in Greece
Sports leagues established in 1935
Volleyball